Two-tone, two tone, or 2 tone, etc., may refer to:

Audio and sound
 Two-tone analysis, in nonlinear system measurement
 Two-tone attention signal
 Two-tone chime, such as the "ding dong" sound of a doorbell
 Two-tone sequential paging, selective calling method in analog 2-way radio transmission
 Two-tone siren, a European type of siren

Language
 Two-tone language
 Diphthong (Greek for two tones), in linguistics, a gliding vowel

Music
 2 Tone (music genre), music genre
 2 Tone Records, record label
 Two Tone Club, French ska band
 "Two-Tone" Tommy, bass musician

Other
 Two-tone color, such as RG color space
 Two-tone paint
 Two-tone pattern
 Two-toned lobsterette
 Two-Tone, dalmatian dog in the 2003 animated film 101 Dalmatians II: Patch's London Adventure and 1996 remake
 Twotone, also known as Ryan Gobbe and Mieli, an Australian electronic musician
 Two-tone testing, a test in radio systems for intermodulation distortion

See also
 Tone (disambiguation)
 Tommy Tutone